Radek Slončík (born 29 May 1973) is a Czech former football player.

Slončík played in the position of midfielder-playmaker. He spent most of his career at Baník Ostrava. In 2000, he moved to Sparta Prague, but he was not very successful and returned to Baník the next season. He was a squad member in Baník Ostrava's 2003-2004 championship season. In 2005, he won the Czech Cup with Baník.

After the 2010/2011 season, Slončík retired from professional football.

References

External links
 
 Profile at iDNES.cz

Czech footballers
Czech Republic under-21 international footballers
Czech Republic international footballers
Czech First League players
1973 births
Living people
FC Baník Ostrava players
AC Sparta Prague players
Újpest FC players
Expatriate footballers in Hungary
Association football midfielders
People from Šumperk
Fotbal Fulnek players
MFK Karviná players
Sportspeople from the Olomouc Region
1997 FIFA Confederations Cup players